Goodwood was an electoral district of the House of Assembly in the Australian state of South Australia from 1938 to 1956.

Goodwood was abolished in a boundary redistribution in 1956, mostly replaced by the Electoral district of Edwardstown.

The suburb of Goodwood is currently divided between the seats of Ashford and Unley.

Members

Walsh went to represent the Electoral district of Edwardstown from March 1956.

Election results

References 

Former electoral districts of South Australia
1938 establishments in Australia
1956 disestablishments in Australia